John Mackey (September 24, 1941 – July 6, 2011) was an American professional football player who was a tight end for the Baltimore Colts and the San Diego Chargers. He was born in Roosevelt, New York and attended Syracuse University. He was the first president of the National Football League Players Association (NFLPA) following the AFL-NFL merger, serving from 1970 to 1973. Mackey was also a major reason the NFLPA created the "88 Plan", which financially supports ex-players who required living assistance in later years.

A five-time Pro Bowler, Mackey was inducted into the Pro Football Hall of Fame in 1992, the second pure tight end elected and is widely regarded as one of the greatest tight ends ever.

College career

Mackey played three seasons at Syracuse University (1960–1962), alternating between the running back, tight end, and wide receiver position.  His first two seasons were on the same team as Ernie Davis, the 1961 Heisman Trophy winner.  Mackey caught a total of 27 passes for 481 yards and 5 touchdowns, while also rushing for 259 yards and 4 more scores.  As a Junior, he set a school record with 321 receiving yards, and caught 4 passes in Syracuse's 15–14 win over the University of Miami in the 1961 Liberty Bowl.  In Mackey's three seasons, Syracuse had a 20–10 record and won the Liberty Bowl each year.

NFL career
Mackey was drafted by the Baltimore Colts with the 19th pick in the second round of the 1963 NFL Draft. As a rookie, he averaged over 20 yards per catch, scored seven touchdowns, and earned a trip to the Pro Bowl.  He also returned 9 kickoffs for 271 yards, an average of 30 yards per return.

He went on to play a total of 10 NFL seasons as tight end, and became known for his size and speed.  Mackey played his first nine seasons with the Colts. After losing his starting role to Tom Mitchell entering the 1972 regular season, he requested to be traded. Colts general manager Joe Thomas placed him on the team's retired list instead, prompting Mackey to demand being put on waivers. He was not claimed by any team in an attempt by franchise owners to blackball him for having been the president of the National Football League Players Association (NFLPA). He eventually signed with the San Diego Chargers on September 18, 1972, after being contacted by the team's defensive backs coach Willie Wood hours after clearing waivers. He retired as an active player at the end of the 1972 season. Although a knee injury forced him into early retirement, Mackey only missed one game in his whole career.

During his 10 seasons in the NFL, Mackey scored 38 touchdowns and caught 331 passes for 5,236 yards.  He also rushed 19 times for 127 yards.  His career yards per catch average of 15.8 is currently the second-highest total among all Hall of Fame tight ends, trailing only Jackie Smith.

Super Bowl V
Mackey played in Super Bowl V on January 17, 1971. He was involved in a famous game-changing play where he caught a record-setting 75-yard touchdown pass from quarterback Johnny Unitas after the ball was deflected twice, once by fellow Colts player Eddie Hinton and once by opposing Dallas Cowboys defenseman Mel Renfro. Baltimore won the game 16–13, following a 32-yard field goal by Jim O'Brien with five seconds left.

Honors
During his playing career, Mackey played in five Pro Bowls, including in his rookie season. He was also named All-NFL three times. In 1992, Mackey was inducted into the Pro Football Hall of Fame, becoming only the second pure tight end to be awarded this honor.

Mackey has been included in several lists of great NFL players. In 1999, The Sporting News ranked Mackey at 48 on their list of "The 100 Greatest Football Players." He also placed at number 42 on the NFL Network's list of the "Top 100 Football Players" in 2010.

In 2001, the John Mackey Award was established by the Nassau County Sports Commission. The award is given yearly to the top college tight end. On September 15, 2007, Mackey's alma mater, Syracuse University, retired number 88 in his honor.

On September 27, 2017, Mackey was installed, posthumously, into the Nassau County High School Athletic Hall of Fame as an athlete. His widow, Sylvia, accepted the honor on his behalf. This was the third class of the Hall of fame, which is housed in the renovated Nassau County Veterans' Memorial Coliseum.

NFL career statistics

Post-playing career

NFL Players Association presidency
In 1970, Mackey became the first president of the National Football League Players Association following the merger of the National Football League and the American Football League. Although the NFL and AFL each had a candidate for president in mind, Mackey emerged as the leader both sides could agree on. Mackey held the position of president until September 1973.

In his first year as president, Mackey organized a strike following a lockout by owners, with NFL players seeking additional pension contributions and insurance benefits, as well as higher pre- and post-season pay. The strike resulted in increased fringe benefits for NFL players totalling more than $12 million. According to former teammate Ordell Braase, Mackey "had a vision for that job, which was more than just putting in time and keeping the natives calm. You don't get anything unless you really rattle the cage." In 1972, Mackey became the lead plaintiff in a court action which led to the overturning of the so-called "Rozelle Rule," which limited a player's ability to act as a free agent. In 1976, the Rozelle Rule was ruled to violate antitrust laws in Mackey v. NFL.

Post-career health problems

Several years after retiring from the NFL, Mackey began experiencing symptoms of dementia. In one incident at an airport checkpoint, Mackey refused to remove his Super Bowl and Hall of Fame rings at the metal detector.  When a guard insisted he take them off, Mackey bolted through the checkpoint.  It took four guards to subdue him.  "I'm just so thankful they didn't shoot him because they had no idea about his mental condition," His wife Sylvia said after the incident. "They easily could have mistaken him for being a bomb-toting terrorist."

Mackey's condition worsened, and his family was forced to put him into a full-time assisted living facility. Although Mackey received a small pension, it was not sufficient to cover the costs of his care, leading his wife Sylvia to reach out to NFL commissioner Paul Tagliabue.

Once made aware of the problem, Tagliabue and NFLPA executive director Gene Upshaw responded with the "88 plan" in February 2007. Named for Mackey's jersey number, the plan provides $88,000 per year for nursing home care and up to $50,000 annually for adult day care for former NFL players, including Mackey, having dementia or Alzheimer's. Mackey died July 6, 2011, at the age of 69. It was revealed by a study by Boston University on his brain that he died of chronic traumatic encephalopathy.

References

External links
 

1941 births
2011 deaths
People from Roosevelt, New York
People from Hempstead (village), New York
Sportspeople from Nassau County, New York
Players of American football from New York (state)
African-American players of American football
American football players with chronic traumatic encephalopathy
American football tight ends
Syracuse Orange football players
Baltimore Colts players
San Diego Chargers players
Western Conference Pro Bowl players
Pro Football Hall of Fame inductees
Presidents of the National Football League Players Association
African-American trade unionists
Deaths from dementia in Maryland
20th-century African-American sportspeople
21st-century African-American people